The third season of the Tyler Perry's House of Payne began airing on December 3, 2008, and concluded on June 3, 2009. It stars Keshia Knight Pulliam as Miranda, Cassi Davis as Ella Payne, LaVan Davis as Curtis Payne, Allen Payne as CJ Payne, Lance Gross as Calvin Payne, Demetria McKinney as Janine Payne, and Larramie "Doc" Shaw as Malik Payne. This season consists of 26 episodes. All episodes of this season of House of Payne were recorded in front of a live studio audience. 

Actress China Anne McClain is not a cast member this season and Denise Burse leaves the show after the fourth episode "Casa De Payne".

Episodes

External links
 Tyler Perry's House of Payne on epguides.com

Tyler Perry's House of Payne seasons
2008 American television seasons
2009 American television seasons